Tom Grant (born February 22, 1946) is an American smooth jazz/jazz fusion pianist and vocalist.

Biography 

Tom Grant was born in Portland, Oregon, to a musical family. His father was a tap dancer who owned a record store in Portland, and his brother, Mukunda Goswami, was an avant-garde jazz pianist (as Michael Grant) until becoming a pioneer from the beginning of the Hare Krishna movement.

Grant learned to play piano and drums when he was young. After graduating from the University of Oregon, he traveled to New York City in 1970 with Native American saxophonist Jim Pepper. This led to Grant touring and recording with jazz greats Woody Shaw, Charles Lloyd, and Tony Williams.

Grant cut his first solo record for Timeless in 1976, and in 1979 he formed his own band. Beginning in 1983, Grant started recording a series of jazz-influenced pop albums that have variously been called "New Adult Contemporary", "Quiet Storm", "Contemporary Jazz" and "Smooth Jazz"; each have been best-sellers in the lite jazz market. 

 and was a guest on a March 1993 episode of The Tonight Show with Jay Leno.

Discography

Studio albums

Compilation albums
 Hands: The Tom Grant Collection (1994)
 Reprise (2001)

As sideman
With Charles Lloyd
Autumn in New York (Destiny, 1979)

References

External links
 
 
 

1946 births
Living people
Smooth jazz pianists
Musicians from Portland, Oregon
Jazz fusion pianists
University of Oregon alumni
Verve Records artists
Shanachie Records artists
Windham Hill Records artists
The Tony Williams Lifetime members
21st-century pianists